Telmário de Araújo Sacramento, known by his nickname Dinei (born November 11, 1983 in São Domingos, Bahia), is a Brazilian football striker who plays for Vitória.

Club statistics
Updated to 31 August 2018.

References

External links

 Profile at Shonan Bellmare
 
  
  
 Dinei at Furacao 
 Loan to Palmeiras at GloboEsporte 
 

1983 births
Living people
Brazilian footballers
Brazilian expatriate footballers
Campeonato Brasileiro Série A players
Campeonato Brasileiro Série B players
La Liga players
Segunda División players
J1 League players
J2 League players
Club Athletico Paranaense players
Clube Atlético Bragantino players
Esporte Clube Vitória players
Associação Ferroviária de Esportes players
Esporte Clube Noroeste players
Guaratinguetá Futebol players
Sociedade Esportiva Palmeiras players
RC Celta de Vigo players
CD Tenerife players
Kashima Antlers players
Shonan Bellmare players
Ventforet Kofu players
Matsumoto Yamaga FC　players
Esporte Clube Água Santa players
Esporte Clube Jacuipense players
Expatriate footballers in Spain
Expatriate footballers in Japan
Brazilian expatriate sportspeople in Spain
Brazilian expatriate sportspeople in Japan
Association football forwards